Gorenje Sušice is a settlement in the Municipality of Dolenjske Toplice in Slovenia. The area is part of the historical region of Lower Carniola. The municipality is now included in the Southeast Slovenia Statistical Region. 

The local church is dedicated to Saint Roch and belongs to the Parish of Toplice. It was built in 1651.

References

External links
Gorenje Sušice on Geopedia

Populated places in the Municipality of Dolenjske Toplice